Fazlul Quader Chowdhury (1919–1973) was a Bengali politician who served as the 5th speaker of the National Assembly of Pakistan from East Pakistan. He belonged to Ayub Khan's Convention Muslim League. He was also the Acting President of Pakistan from time to time when Ayub Khan left the country. His elder brother Fazlul Kabir Chowdhury was the leader of the opposition in East Pakistan assembly. Quader was preceded by Maulvi Tamizuddin Khan of Awami League.

Early life and family 
Chaudhury was born on 26 March 1919 to a Bengali Muslim zamindar family in Gahira, Raozan, located in the Chittagong District of the Bengal Province. His father, Khan Bahadur Abdul Jabbar Chaudhry, was descended from Bakhsh-e-Ali Chaudhry, and his mother, Begum Fatema Khatun Chaudhrani, was a housewife. His mother's grandmother was the 18th-century poet Rahimunnessa. Chaudhury's brother Fazlul Kabir Chowdhury was also a parliamentarian.

Education
Chaudhry graduated from Calcutta Presidency College and earned B.L degree from Calcutta University Law College. In 1941 he was elected general secretary of All-India Muslim Student Federation. He joined the All-India Muslim League and was elected the secretary of Chittagong district unit of the party in 1943.

Career 
In 1947, Fazlul Qadir Chaudhry supported the United Bengal pact of Sarat Bose and Huseyn Shaheed Suhrawardy, but when Suhrawardy agreed to form Pakistan, he failed from presenting the matter to Muhammad Ali Jinnah.

Chaudhury was elected member of the Pakistan National Assembly in 1962. In Ayub Khan's cabinet he served in the Ministry of Agriculture and Works, the Ministry of Education and Information and the Ministry of Labour and Social Welfare. He played an important role in floating the Convention Muslim League (1962) and was elected a member of the central committee of the party.

He facilitated the foundation of University of Chittagong, Chittagong University of Engineering & Technology, Chittagong Medical College, Chittagong Marine Academy, Chittagong Marine Fisheries and the Polytechnic Institute.

Personal life
Chaudhry married Syeda Selena Akhtar, the second daughter of Syed Azizullah and Syeda Ammatul Ela Raziya Khatun. They had six children. Their eldest son, Salahuddin Quader Chowdhury, was a six-time Bangladeshi parliamentarian and adviser to Khaleda Zia. Their second son, Saifuddin Qadir Chaudhry, was a businessman and their third son, Giasuddin Quader Chowdhury, was also a parliamentarian. Their fourth son, Jamaluddin Qadir Chaudhry, was an industrialist and the names of their two daughters are Zubayda Qadir Chaudhry and Hasina Qadir Chaudhry. Fazlul Qadir Chaudhry's elder sister-in-law, Syeda Roqeya Akhtar, was the wife of former Finance Minister Murtaza Raza Choudhry.

Arrest and death
In 1973, after the independence of Bangladesh (former East Pakistan), he was jailed in Bangladesh  for war crimes as collaborator of Pakistan Army during 1971. He died in Dhaka Central Jail on 17 July 1973.

Legacy
Chaudhury's elder son Salahuddin Quader Chowdhury was a politician. He was elected member of the Bangladeshi Parliament six times. In October 2015, Supreme Court of Bangladesh upheld the death sentence awarded by international crime tribunal for the alleged crime committed by Salahuddin Quader Chowdhury during the Liberation war of Bangladesh in 1971. The death sentence was executed on early hours of 22 November 2015 inside Dhaka Central Jail.

References 

1973 deaths
20th-century Bengalis
Bangladeshi Muslims
Speakers of the National Assembly of Pakistan
1919 births
Acting presidents of Pakistan
Bangladeshi politicians convicted of crimes
People from Chittagong District
Pakistani MNAs 1965–1969
Bangladeshi male criminals
Prisoners and detainees of Bangladesh